Ibsen Adalberto Castro Avelar (born 24 October 1988) is a Salvadoran professional footballer who plays as a defender for Primera División club FAS.

Castro was born in Quezaltepeque, La Libertad, and played youth football with Atlético Marte before joining the first team in 2010.

Club career

Atlético Marte 
Castro began his youth career at the San Salvador club, Atlético Marte. He made his first team debut 2010 and amassed 72 appearances and scored 6 goals for Los Marcianos during a two-year spell.

Águila 
In June 2014, Castro signed with Águila. He made his debut for Águila in a 3–0 victory against Alianza. He scored his first goal for Águila in a 1–2 defeat against Santa Tecla in the Estadio Las Delicias, in August 2014.

With Águila, Castro disputed the finals of the Apertura 2014 and the Clausura 2016, but they were defeated by Isidro Metapán (on penalties) and Dragón (0–1) respectively.

Sonsonate 
Castro signed with Sonsonate for the Apertura 2017. He scored his first goal for Sonsonate in a 1–1 draw against Águila in the Estadio Cuscatlán, in July 2017.

FAS 
In 2018, he signed with FAS for the Apertura 2018. He scored a crucial goal in a 1–0 victory against Sonsonate in the Estadio Óscar Quiteño in October 2018.

With FAS, he reached the semifinals of the Apertura 2018.

He won the Salvadorian tournament with CD FAS in 2021 against alianza.

International
Castro was first called up to the El Salvador national team in 2014. He was called up for the 2014 Copa Centroamericana and started the first group stage game, a 2–1 loss against Guatemala, in an eventual fourth-place finish for El Salvador.

Castro has won seven caps with the El Salvador national football team at the moment.

Honours

Club 
FAS
Salvadoran Primera División: Clausura 2021

International 
El Salvador
Copa Centroamericana: 2014 4th place

References

1988 births
Living people
2014 Copa Centroamericana players
2017 Copa Centroamericana players
C.D. Atlético Marte footballers
C.D. Águila footballers
Salvadoran footballers
El Salvador international footballers
Association football defenders